Rosina Mantovani Gutti (1851–1943) was an Italian painter known for painting children.

Life
Gutti was born in Rome. Her work The Peacemaker was included in the book Women Painters of the World. This became a popular print and was the primary illustration on an Australian poster for WWI war bonds. The image was also used on a Canadian WWI poster "For Your Children Buy War Savings Certificates and they will live to thank you". A sketch of this group titled "Three infants" is in the collection of the British National Trust.

She is known for portraits of children, but she also made a portrait of the actress Eleonora Duse. Gutti died in Rome in 1943. Her published work was in copyright until 2013.

References

1851 births
1943 deaths
Painters from Rome
Italian women painters
20th-century Italian painters
19th-century Italian painters
19th-century Italian women artists
20th-century Italian women artists